Aikins is a surname, and may refer to:

 James Cox Aikins (1823–1904), Canadian politician, cabinet minister
 James Albert Manning Aikins (1851–1929), Canadian politician in Manitoba
 John Somerset Aikins (1850–1911), financier and politician in Manitoba
 Luke Aikins (born 1973), professional skydiver, BASE jumper, pilot, and aerial photographer
 Matthieu Aikins, a journalist known for reporting on the war in Afghanistan

See also
 Akins
 Aikin